The 3rd Foreign Parachute Regiment was a parachute regiment of the Foreign Legion in the French Army and previous 3rd Foreign Parachute Battalion, (3e BEP) from September 1, 1955, to December 1, 1955.

Based at Batna, the regiment becomes operational but then is dissolved on December 1, 1955; the legionnaires constituting the regiment are merged with the 2e BEP to form a new unit, the 2e REP.

Insignias 
The insignia of the Foreign Legion Paratroopers of France represents a closed 
"winged armed dextrochere", meaning a "right winged arm" armed with a sword pointing upwards. The Insignia makes reference to the Patron of Paratroopers. In fact, the Insignia represents "the right Arm of Saint Michael", the Archangel which according to Liturgy is the "Armed Arm of God". This Insignia is the symbol of righteous combat and fidelity to superior missions.

Regimental Commanders

Notable Officers and Legionnaires
Paul Arnaud de Foïard
Pierre Jeanpierre
Hélie de Saint Marc

References

External links 
 3e REP - History & images of the 3e REP

Parachute infantry regiments of France
Parachute
Military units and formations established in 1955
Military units and formations disestablished in 1955
Parachute Regiment, 3rd Foreign
1955 establishments in the French colonial empire